How I'm Feeling (stylized as ~how i'm feeling~) is the debut studio album by American singer-songwriter Lauv. It was released on March 6, 2020, by AWAL. The album was supported by eleven singles, with three featuring artists such as Australian singer Troye Sivan, English singer Anne Marie, and American pop band LANY, with the single with Sivan peaking at number eighty one on the Billboard Hot 100. Upon release, new tracks featured collaborations with Canadian singer Alessia Cara, Mexican singer Sofia Reyes and South Korean boy band BTS. How I'm Feeling received mixed to positive reviews from music critics.

Commercially, the album debuted at number sixteen on the Billboard 200 in the US, number nine on the UK Albums Chart in the UK and number eleven on the Canadian Albums Chart in Canada. In October 2021, the album was certified gold by the Recording Industry Association of America (RIAA) for combined sales, streaming and track-sales equivalent of five hundred thousand units.

Cover art
The cover depicts miniature versions of Lauv standing and sitting on him wearing colorful outfits. According to Lauv, these characters are "represented by purple (existential Lauv), blue (hopeless romantic Lauv), green (goofy Lauv), yellow (positive Lauv), orange (fuckboy Lauv) and red (spicy Lauv), all of which make up [his] identity." The music video for "Sims" would "bring the album concept and characters to life for the first time", and allowed viewers to get a glimpse inside Lauv's mind and learn about the concept behind the album.

Singles
The lead single from the album, called "I'm So Tired..." with Troye Sivan was released on January 24, 2019. The music video was released on February 14, 2019. The song peaked at number 81 on the Billboard Hot 100.

Commercial performance
How I'm Feeling debuted at number sixteen on the Billboard 200. On October 18, 2021, the album was certified gold by the Recording Industry Association of America (RIAA) for combined sales, streaming and track-sales equivalent of five hundred thousand units.

Critical reception

How I'm Feeling received mixed to positive reviews from music critics. At Metacritic, which assigns a normalized rating out of 100 to reviews from mainstream publications, the album received an average score of 67, based on six reviews, indicating "generally favorable reviews".

Track listing

Notes
"Fuck, I'm Lonely" and "I'm So Tired..." are stylized in all lowercase.
"Who" only features Jimin and Jungkook of BTS, not the whole group.

Charts

Weekly charts

Year-end charts

Certifications

References

2020 debut albums
Lauv albums
Albums produced by Johan Carlsson
Albums produced by Jon Bellion